Rivasinh Hardevsinh Solanki alias Rivaba Ravindrasinh Jadeja (born 02 November 1990) is an Indian politician. She is a member of the Gujarat Legislative Assembly from the Jamnagar North Assembly constituency as a Member of the Bharatiya Janata Party. She was elected on 8 December 2022.

References 

Living people
1990 births
Gujarat MLAs 2022–2027
Bharatiya Janata Party politicians from Gujarat